Angelus Novus is an album of contemporary classical music by American composer and alto saxophonist/multi-instrumentalist John Zorn including compositions written in 1972 ("Christabel"), and 1983 ("For Your Eyes Only").

Reception
The Allmusic review by Stacia Proefrock awarded the album 3 stars stating "the whole album, while not shining with the crystalline perfection of his best work, is a solid example of thoughtful composition".

Track listing 
All compositions by John Zorn.
 "For Your Eyes Only" - 13:43 
 "Christabel: Part 1" - 4:04
 "Christabel: Part 2" - 3:47
 "Carny" - 12:54 
 "Angelus Novus: Peshat" - 2:05
 "Angelus Novus: Tzomet" - 1:24
 "Angelus Novus: Aliya" - 4:35
 "Angelus Novus: Herut" - 1:46
 "Angelus Novus: Pardes" - 2:53
Recorded at New England Conservatory's Jordan Hall, Boston in June, 1992 (track 3), on February 6, 1996 (track 1), November 18, 1996 (tracks 2-3) and April 15, 1997 (tracks 5-9)

Personnel 
 The Callithumpian Consort of the New England Conservatory
 Stephen Drury: Artistic Director, Piano

References 

1998 albums
Albums produced by John Zorn
John Zorn albums
Tzadik Records albums